The 1999 Grand Prix de Denain was the 41st edition of the Grand Prix de Denain cycle race and was held on 22 April 1999. The race started and finished in Denain. The race was won by Jeroen Blijlevens.

General classification

References

1999
1999 in road cycling
1999 in French sport
April 1999 sports events in Europe